(Latin for "The Species of Plants") is a book by Carl Linnaeus, originally published in 1753, which lists every species of plant known at the time, classified into genera. It is the first work to consistently apply binomial names and was the starting point for the naming of plants.

Publication
 was published on 1 May 1753 by Laurentius Salvius in Stockholm, in two volumes. A second edition was published in 1762–1763, and a third edition in 1764, although this "scarcely differed" from the second. Further editions were published after Linnaeus' death in 1778, under the direction of Karl Ludwig Willdenow, the director of the Berlin Botanical Garden; the fifth edition (1800) was published in four volumes.

Importance

 was the first botanical work to consistently apply the binomial nomenclature system of naming to any large group of organisms (Linnaeus' tenth edition of  would apply the same technique to animals for the first time in 1758). In , these cumbersome names were replaced with two-part names, consisting of a single-word genus name, and a single-word specific epithet or "trivial name"; the two examples above became Plantago media and Nepeta cataria, respectively. The use of binomial names had originally been developed as a kind of shorthand in a student project about the plants eaten by cattle.

After the specific epithet, Linnaeus gave a short description of each species, and a synonymy. The descriptions were careful and terse, consisting of few words in small genera; in Glycyrrhiza, for instance, the three species (Glycyrrhiza echinata, Glycyrrhiza glabra and "Glycyrrhiza hirsuta", respectively) were described as "", "" and "".

Because it is the first work in which binomial nomenclature was consistently applied,  was chosen as the "starting point" for the nomenclature of most plants (the nomenclature of some non-vascular plants and all fungi uses later starting points).

Contents
 contained descriptions of the thousands of plant species known to Linnaeus at the time. In the first edition, there were 5,940 names, from Acalypha australis to Zygophyllum spinosum. In his introduction, Linnaeus estimated that there were fewer than 10,000 plant species in existence; there are now thought to be around 400,000 species of flowering plants alone.

The species were arranged in around a thousand genera, which were grouped into 24 classes, according to Linnaeus' sexual system of classification. Linnaeus' sexual system is now acknowledged to be an artificial system, rather than one which accurately reflects shared ancestry, but the system's simplicity made it easier for non-specialists to rapidly find the correct class, being based on simple counts of floral parts such as stigmas and stamens.

Notes

References

Bibliography  

  
 Species Plantarum, vol. 1, vol. 2 at Biodiversity Heritage Library facsimile
 Species Plantarum, vol. 1, vol. 2 at Botanicus
  
 Species Plantarum at Project Gutenberg I-III IV–V VI–X XI–XIII text
 Linnaeus Link Union Catalogue

1753 books
Botanical nomenclature
Florae (publication)
Botany books
Carl Linnaeus
1753 in science
18th-century Latin books